Elphidium is an abundant genus of foraminifera. Species can be found from coastal regions out to the continental slope, and in all temperature ranges. Like other forams, fossils from different species are used to date rocks. The taxonomy of the species within this genus is disputed due to the high variability of some species.

Description
Elphidium is generally around 1 mm in size. The test is spiral-shaped, and can be red, orange, or brown. This shell is made up of calcium carbonate. Species of this genus have seven to twenty chambers in the final whorl, and may have an umbilical plug on each side.  In some species the rim is sharp, while in others it is more rounded. Another distinctive feature is the retral processes (small backward extensions of the chamber walls) that cross the sutures, giving some the appearance of tiny rolled up glass baskets.  Elphidium crawls using a type of pseudopod called reticulopodia.

Life cycle
Elphidium shows dimorphism with alternating generations. 
The complete cycle for Elphidium crispum takes two years in the shallower marine regions, although it may be delayed at deeper stations. 
Asexual reproduction reaches a peak in spring of the first year. 
Sexual reproduction  begins early in the second spring as temperatures begin to rise. 
The gametes conjugate outside in open sea to produce zygotes and the B form then develops and matures during the second summer.
Lister (1895) observed Elphidium  in two different forms as megalospheric form (sexual form) and microsperic form (asexual form). The megalosperic form was developed from the microsperic form. The gametes which gives rise to microspheric form by syngamy. 
Elphidium exhibits an alternation of generation in its life cycle. The megalosperic forms alternates with microspheric forms. The microspheric forms are developed by the conjugation or syngamy. It means there is always an alternations of asexual (microspheric) and sexual (megalospheric) generation in Elphidium.
The microspheric form reproduces asexually by fission to produce a number of amoebulae. The inner cytoplasm mass containing several nuclei creeps out of the shell and remains as a lump around it. A small amount of cytoplasm collects around each nucleus. As a result, a large number of amoeboid cells are formed. Each amoebula secretes the proloculum, formsrhizopodia, then it grows and forms other chambers of the shell to become a megalospheric forms.
The megalospheric form reproduces sexually by syngamy or conjugation. During sexual reproduction in megalospheric forms, nucleus first breaks up into many small nuclei and the cytoplasm collects around each of these nuclei. The nuclei divide twice giving rise to a large haploid and known as isogametes.  Isogametes of two different individuals fuse in pairs to form zygotes. These are then develops into microspheric form.
The life cycle of Elphidium may be summarized as follows: the microspheric forms produce amoebulae by asexual fission which develops into megalospheric forms. The megalospheric forms produce flagellated isogametes which after syngamy produce zygotes that develop into microspheric forms. Thus, its life cycle clearly exhibits the phenomenon of alternations of asexual microspheric generations with sexual megalospheric generations.

Subdivisions 

Subgenus Elphidium (Parrellina) Carter, 1958
Elphidium (Parrellina) centrifugalis Carter, 1958
Subgenus Elphidium (Polystomella) Heron-Allen & Earland, 1932
Elphidium incertae sedis
Elphidium abyssicola Ishiwada, 1964
Elphidium aculeatum (d'Orbigny, 1846)
Elphidium adelaidense Howchin & Parr, 1938
Elphidium advenum (Cushman, 1922)
Elphidium africanum LeRoy, 1953
Elphidium aguafrescaense Todd & Kniker, 1952
Elphidium alaskense Cushman & Todd, 1947
Elphidium albanii Hayward, 1997 in Hayward, Hollis & Grenfell, 1997
Elphidium alvarezianum (d'Orbigny, 1839)
Elphidium ancestrum Le Calvez, 1950
Elphidium argenteum Parr, 1945
Elphidium armenium Saakyan-Gezalyan, 1957
Elphidium articulatum (d'Orbigny, 1839)
Elphidium asagaiense Asano, 1949
Elphidium asanoi Kaiho, 1984
Elphidium asanoi Matsunaga, 1963
Elphidium asiaticum Polski, 1959
Elphidium asklundi Brotzen, 1943
Elphidium australis Cushman & Parker, 1931
Elphidium azerbaidjanicum Mamedova, 1966
Elphidium aznaburticum Pronina, 1964
Elphidium bartletti Cushman, 1933
Elphidium batavum Hofker, 1968
Elphidium batialis Saidova, 1961
Elphidium bhattacharyai Jauhri, 1994
Elphidium biperforatus (Whittaker & Hodgkinson, 1979)
Elphidium bogdanowiczi Pronina, 1964
Elphidium bosoense Fujita, 1956
Elphidium botaniense Albani, 1981
Elphidium brooklynense Shupack, 1934
Elphidium californicum Cook Ms., 1959
Elphidium capelavelaense McCulloch, 1981
Elphidium carenerosensis Bermúdez & Fuenmayor, 1966
Elphidium cariacoense Bermúdez & Seiglie, 1963
Elphidium carpentariaense Albani & Yassini, 1993
Elphidium carteri Hayward, 1997 in Hayward, Hollis & Grenfell, 1997
Elphidium cercadense Bermúdez, 1949
Elphidium chapmani Cushman, 1936
Elphidium charlottense (Vella, 1957)
Elphidium cherifi Anan, 2010
Elphidium chilenum Todd & Kniker, 1952
Elphidium clarki Graham, 1950
Elphidium clavatum Cushman Em. Loeblich & Tappan, 1953
Elphidium cochense McCulloch, 1981
Elphidium collinsi Hayward, 1997 in Hayward, Hollis & Grenfell, 1997
Elphidium colomboense McCulloch, 1977
Elphidium colomi Ferrer, 1971
Elphidium complanatum (d'Orbigny, 1839)
Elphidium compressulum Copeland, 1964
Elphidium concinnum Khalilov, 1957
Elphidium concinnum Nicol, 1944
Elphidium consociatum Khalilov, 1957
Elphidium costiferum (Terquem, 1882)
Elphidium crassatum Cushman, 1936
Elphidium crassimargo Shchedrina, 1984
Elphidium craticulatum (Fichtel & Moll, 1798)
Elphidium crespinae Cushman, 1936
Elphidium crispum (Linnaeus, 1758)
Elphidium cristobalense McCulloch, 1981
Elphidium cubaguaense McCulloch, 1981
Elphidium culebrense Cushman, 1936
Elphidium cuvillieri Levy, 1966
Elphidium cynicalis Jennings, 1936
Elphidium decipiens (O.G.Costa, 1856)
Elphidium decorum Qiu & Lin, 1978
Elphidium deferrariisi Malumián, 1990
Elphidium delicatulum Bermúdez, 1949
Elphidium discoidale (d'Orbigny, 1839)
Elphidium dominicense Bermúdez, 1949
Elphidium dopperti Daniels, 2001
Elphidium duzdagicum Pronina, 1964
Elphidium earlandi Cushman, 1936
Elphidium echinus Serova, 1955
Elphidium elegans Serova, 1955
Elphidium elegantum (Hofker, 1976)
Elphidium ellisi Weiss, 1954
Elphidium eocenicum Cushman & Ellisor, 1931
Elphidium excubitor Nicol, 1944
Elphidium exoticum Haynes, 1973
Elphidium ezoense Asano, 1937
Elphidium fastigiatum Cushman, 1945
Elphidium fax Nicol, 1944
Elphidium fedorowi Bogdanovich, 1960
Elphidium felsense Papp, 1963
Elphidium ferrentegranulum Krasheninnikov, 1960
Elphidium fichtelianum (d'Orbigny, 1846)
Elphidium fijiense Hayward, 1997 in Hayward, Hollis & Grenfell, 1997
Elphidium fimbriatulum (Cushman, 1918)
Elphidium fissurisuturalum Wang, He & Lu, 1988
Elphidium flexuosum (d'Orbigny, 1846)
Elphidium florentinae Shupack, 1934
Elphidium formosum Todd, 1957
Elphidium friedbergi Serova, 1955
Elphidium frigidum Cushman, 1933
Elphidium frizzelli Miller, 1953
Elphidium galvestonense Kornfeld, 1931
Elphidium georgianum Cushman, 1935
Elphidium georgium Venglinsky, 1958
Elphidium gibsoni Hayward, 1979
Elphidium glabratum Cushman, 1939
Elphidium granatum Gudina, 1964
Elphidium granti Kleinpell, 1938
Elphidium granulosum (Sidebottom, 1909)
Elphidium grimensis Quilty, 1980
Elphidium groenlandicum Cushman, 1933
Elphidium guraboense Bermúdez, 1949
Elphidium haagensis van Voorthuysen, 1950
Elphidium hadleyana Smitter, 1955
Elphidium halickii Brodniewicz, 1972
Elphidium hallandense Brotzen, 1943
Elphidium hampdenense Finlay, 1939
Elphidium hauerinum (d'Orbigny, 1846)
Elphidium hawkesburyense (Albani, 1974)
Elphidium helenae Quilty, 1980
Elphidium hiltermanni Hagn, 1952
Elphidium hispidulum Cushman, 1936
Elphidium hokkaidoense Asano, 1950
Elphidium hornibrooki Srinivasan, 1966
Elphidium howchini Cushman, 1936
Elphidium hughesi Cushman & Grant, 1927
Elphidium humboldtensis Haller, 1980
Elphidium hungaricum Korecz-Laky, 1967
Elphidium hyalocostatum Todd, 1957
Elphidium ibericum (Schrodt, 1890)
Elphidium icenorum Macfadyen, 1939
Elphidium inchonense Mcculloch, 1977
Elphidium inclarum Krasheninnikov, 1960
Elphidium indicum Cushman, 1936
Elphidium infrajuliense Bertels, 1977
Elphidium ingressans Dorreen, 1948
Elphidium inopinatum Khalilov, 1957
Elphidium iojimaense Asano & Murata, 1958
Elphidium iranicum (Yassini & Ghahreman, 1977)
Elphidium ishikariense Kaiho, 1984
Elphidium izumoense Nomura, 1990
Elphidium javanum Yabe & Asano, 1937
Elphidium jiani Lei & Li, 2016
Elphidium johnstonae Mclean, 1956
Elphidium joukovi Serova, 1955
Elphidium kadilnicovi Semenov & Semenova, 1980
Elphidium kaicherae Mclean, 1956
Elphidium kaneharai Ishiwada, 1958
Elphidium kanoum Hayward, 1979
Elphidium karenae Asbjornsdottir, 1994
Elphidium karpaticum Myatlyuk, 1950
Elphidium kazmakrisense Mamedova, 1966
Elphidium kerguelenense Parr, 1950
Elphidium kobense McCulloch, 1977
Elphidium koberi Tollmann, 1955
Elphidium koeboeense LeRoy, 1939
Elphidium kozlowskii Brodniewicz, 1965
Elphidium kudakoense Bogdanovich, 1947
Elphidium kusiroense Asano, 1938
Elphidium laeve (d'Orbigny in Parker, Jones & Brady, 1865)
Elphidium lagunense (Albani & Balbero, 1982)
Elphidium laloviensis Venglinsky, 1948
Elphidium lanieri (d'Orbigny, 1839)
Elphidium latidorsatum (Reuss, 1864)
Elphidium latispatium Poag, 1966
Elphidium latusovum Krasheninnikov, 1960
Elphidium lauritaense Todd & Kniker, 1952
Elphidium lautenschlaegeri Voloshinova, 1952
Elphidium lene Cushman & McCulloch, 1940
Elphidium lens Galloway & Heminway, 1941
Elphidium leonensis Applin & Jordan, 1945
Elphidium lessonii (d'Orbigny, 1839)
Elphidium ligatum Krasheninnikov, 1960
Elphidium limatulum Copeland, 1964
Elphidium limpidum Ho, Hu & Wang, 1965
Elphidium lobatum Galloway & Heminway, 1941
Elphidium ludbrookae Bhalla & Dev, 1988
Elphidium mabutii Asano, 1962
Elphidium macellum (Fichtel & Moll, 1798)
Elphidium maioricense Colom, 1942
Elphidium manibulum Khalilov, 1957
Elphidium maorium Hayward, 1997
Elphidium margaritaceum Cushman, 1930
Elphidium marshallana Todd & Post, 1954
Elphidium matagordanum (Kornfeld, 1931)
Elphidium matanginuiense Hayward, 1997
Elphidium matauraense Hayward, 1997
Elphidium matsuense Nomura, 1990
Elphidium matsukawauraense Takayanagi, 1955
Elphidium mawsoni Parr, 1950
Elphidium mexicanum Kornfeld, 1931
Elphidium microelegans Serova, 1955
Elphidium microgranulosum Galloway & Wissler, 1951
Elphidium miikense Murata, 1961
Elphidium millettiforme McCulloch, 1977
Elphidium minutum (Reuss, 1865)
Elphidium mirandum Krasheninnikov, 1960
Elphidium mironovi Voloshinova, 1952
Elphidium morenoi Bermúdez, 1935
Elphidium mortonbayense Albani & Yassini, 1993
Elphidium multacamerum Krasheninnikov, 1960
Elphidium mundulum Todd & Low, 1960
Elphidium musselroeensis Quilty, 1980
Elphidium nagaoi Asano, 1938
Elphidium nakanokawaense Shirai, 1960
Elphidium nataliae Popescu, 1995
Elphidium nautiloideum Galloway & Heminway, 1941
Elphidium neocrespinae Gibson, 1983
Elphidium neosimplex McCulloch, 1977
Elphidium nigarense Cushman, 1936
Elphidium nipeense Keijzer, 1945
Elphidium noniformis Gerke in Voloshinova & Dain, 1952
Elphidium nonioniformis Smigielska, 1957
Elphidium norvangi Buzas, Smith & Beem, 1977
Elphidium notabilis Pishvanova, 1958
Elphidium novozealandicum Cushman, 1936
Elphidium obtusum (d'Orbigny, 1846)
Elphidium oceanense (d'Orbigny in Fornasini, 1904)
Elphidium oceanicum Cushman, 1933
Elphidium oligocenicum Khalilov, 1951
Elphidium ombetsuense Asano, 1962
Elphidium omotoensis Dorreen, 1948
Elphidium omuraense Shuto, 1953
Elphidium onerosum Bogdanovich, 1960
Elphidium orientale Voloshinova, 1952
Elphidium owenianum (d'Orbigny, 1839)
Elphidium ozawai Uchio, 1951
Elphidium panamense Cushman, 1936
Elphidium papillosum Cushman, 1936
Elphidium paraense Petri, 1954
Elphidium paraskevaidisi Christodoulou, 1960
Elphidium parviforme McCulloch, 1981
Elphidium parvulum Aoki, 1968
Elphidium parvum Zheng, 1980
Elphidium parvus Eremeeva, 1961
Elphidium patagonicum Todd & Kniker, 1952
Elphidium perforatum Nomura, 1990
Elphidium perscitum Serova, 1955
Elphidium philippense Hayward, 1997
Elphidium phillipense Hayward, 1997 in Hayward, Hollis & Grenfell, 1997
Elphidium pilasense McCulloch, 1977
Elphidium planiforme McCulloch, 1981
Elphidium planulatum (Lamarck, 1822)
Elphidium planum Husezima & Maruhasi, 1944
Elphidium podolicum Serova, 1955
Elphidium ponticum (Dolgopolskaya & Pauli, 1931)
Elphidium primum Ten Dam, 1944
Elphidium pseudoinflatum Cushman, 1936
Elphidium pseudolessonii Ten Dam & Reinhold, 1941
Elphidium pseudonodosum Cushman, 1936
Elphidium puertoricense Galloway & Heminway, 1941
Elphidium pulvereum Todd, 1958
Elphidium punctatum (Terquem, 1878)
Elphidium puscharovski Serova, 1955
Elphidium pusillogranosum Venglinsky, 1958
Elphidium pustulisuturale Wang & Cheng, 1981
Elphidium pustulosum Cushman & McCulloch, 1940
Elphidium rarum Husezima & Maruhasi, 1944
Elphidium rasshamali Haque, 1970
Elphidium reginum (d'Orbigny, 1846)
Elphidium reticulosum Cushman, 1933
Elphidium rioturbiense Malumián, 1994
Elphidium rischtanicum Bykova, 1939
Elphidium rolshauseni Cushman & Ellisor, 1939
Elphidium rota Ellis, 1939
Elphidium rotatum Howchin & Parr, 1938
Elphidium rugosum (d'Orbigny, 1846)
Elphidium rugulosum Cushman & Wickenden, 1929
Elphidium rutteni Hermes, 1945
Elphidium saginatum Finlay, 1939
Elphidium sagrum (d'Orbigny, 1839)
Elphidium saitoi Asano & Murata, 1958
Elphidium salebrosum Serova, 1955
Elphidium samueli Zlinská, 1993
Elphidium sandiegoense (Lankford, 1973)
Elphidium sandongensis He & Hu, 1978
Elphidium schencki Cushman & Dusenbury, 1934
Elphidium schreiteri Eichenberg, 1935
Elphidium semiinvolutum Myatlyuk, 1956
Elphidium semistriatum (d'Orbigny, 1852)
Elphidium sendaiense Takayanagi, 1950
Elphidium seranense Valk, 1945
Elphidium seymourense McCulloch, 1977
Elphidium shochinae Mayer, 1968
Elphidium silvestrii Hayward, 1997 in Hayward, Hollis & Grenfell, 1997
Elphidium simaense Makiyama & Nakagawa, 1941
Elphidium simulatum McCulloch, 1977
Elphidium singaporense McCulloch, 1977
Elphidium skyringense Todd & Kniker, 1952
Elphidium smithi Cushman & Dusenbury, 1934
Elphidium somaense Takayanagi, 1955
Elphidium spinatum Cushman & Valentine, 1930
Elphidium stebnicaensis Pishvanova, 1964
Elphidium stellans Krasheninnikov, 1960
Elphidium stelliferum Khalilov, 1957
Elphidium stimulum Cushman & McCulloch, 1940
Elphidium strattoni (Applin, 1925)
Elphidium striatopunctatum (Fichtel & Moll, 1798)
Elphidium subcarinatum (Egger, 1857)
Elphidium subcrispum Nakamura, 1937
Elphidium subfichtelianum Mamedova, 1966
Elphidium subincertum Asano, 1950
Elphidium subinflatum Cushman, 1936
Elphidium subnodosum (Münster, 1838)
Elphidium subrotatum Hornibrook, 1961
Elphidium subsphaericum Cushman & Hedberg, 1930
Elphidium sumitomoi Asano & Murata, 1958
Elphidium suzukii Husezima & Maruhasi, 1944
Elphidium taiwanum Nakamura, 1937
Elphidium tengiense Mamedova, 1966
Elphidium terquemianum Le Calvez, 1950
Elphidium tikutoensis Nakamura, 1937
Elphidium toddae Petri, 1955
Elphidium tongaense (Cushman, 1931)
Elphidium transcarpaticum Venglinsky, 1948
Elphidium translucens Natland, 1938
Elphidium tropicale Petri, 1954
Elphidium tsudai Chiji & Nakaseko, 1950
Elphidium tumidum Natland, 1938
Elphidium twiggsanum Cushman, 1945
Elphidium ukrainicum Krasheninnikov, 1960
Elphidium ustilatum Todd, 1957
Elphidium vavauense Hayward, 1997 in Hayward, Hollis & Grenfell, 1997
Elphidium vellai Hayward, 1997
Elphidium venetum (Albani, Favero & Serandrei Barbero, 1991)
Elphidium vitreum Collins, 1974
Elphidium voorthuyseni Haake, 1962
Elphidium vulgare Voloshinova, 1952
Elphidium waddense van Voorthuysen, 1975
Elphidium wadeae (Hornibrook, 1961)
Elphidium wakkanabense Kaiho, 1992
Elphidium williamsoni Haynes, 1973
Elphidium wordeni McCulloch, 1977
Elphidium yumotoense Asano, 1949
Elphidium zeivensis Khalilov, 1957

References 

 Loeblich and Helen Tappan, 1964. Sarcodina Chiefly "Thecamoebians" and Foraminiferida; Treatise on Invertebrate Paleontology, Part C Protista 2. Geological Society of America and University of Kansas Press. 
  _ 1988. Forminiferal Genera and their Classification. E-book 

 For illustrations see: Elphidium, World Modern Foraminifera Database

Further reading 
 

Elphidiidae
Rotaliida genera
Cenozoic life
Extant Eocene first appearances